The Roman Catholic Diocese of Willemstad is a diocese of the Latin Church of the Roman Catholic Church in the Caribbean. The diocese encompasses the territory of the Kingdom of the Netherlands in the Caribbean: the countries (Dutch: landen) Aruba, Curaçao, Sint Maarten (the southern half of St. Martin) and the islands Bonaire, St. Eustatius, Saba (which are part of the Netherlands). The cathedra is in the city of Curaçao. The diocese is a suffragan of the Archdiocese of Port of Spain, and a member of the Antilles Episcopal Conference.

The Diocese of Willemstad was erected in 1752 as the Prefecture Apostolic of Curaçao. It was elevated to an apostolic vicariate on 20 September 1842 and to the Diocese of Willemstad on 28 April 1958. The language spoken in many of the Catholic churches here is Papiamento and English. The diocese has maintained a website in this language and in English. Some priests are members of the Society of the Divine Word (SVD), Order of Preachers (OP), Michaelites (CSMA), and Salesians of Don Bosco (SDB).

Bishops

Ordinaries
Martinus Johannes Niewindt (1823-1860)
Johannes Fredericus Antonius Kistemaker O.P. (1860-1869)
Petrus Hendricus Josephus van Ewyk, O.P. (1869–1886)
Ceslaus H. J. Heynen (1886–1887)
Alphonsus M. H. Joosten (1888–1896)
Ambrosius Jacobus J. van Baars, O.P. (1897–1910)
Michael Antonio Maria Vuylsteke, O.P. (1910–1930)
Pietro Giovanni Umberto Verriet, O.P. (1931–1948)
Antonio Ludovico van der Veen Zeppenfeldt, O.P. (1948–1956)
Joannes Maria Michael Holterman, O.P. (1956–1973)
Wilhelm Michel Ellis (1973–2001)
Luis Antonio Secco, S.D.B. (Salesians of Don Bosco) (2001– )

Coadjutor bishops
Johannes Fredericus Antonius Kistemaker O.P. (1852-1860) as Coadjutor Vicar Apostolic
Luis Antonio Secco, S.D.B. (Salesians of Don Bosco) (2000-2001)

Catholic churches and parishes
Listed by island (alphabetically), neighborhood (alphabetically), and church name and full address:

Island of Aruba
 Brasil: Cristo Rey, Brasil 39, Brasil, Aruba
 Dakota: La Birgen di Fatima, Milonstraat 9, Dakota, Oranjestad, Aruba
 Madiki: Cristo Sufriente Chapel (Madiki Chapel), Belgiestraat Madiki 29, Madiki, Oranjestad, Aruba
 Noord: Santa Ana, Caya Frans Figaroa Noord 16, Noord, Aruba; La Birgen di Alto Vista Chapel (Pilgrims Chapel), Alto Vista, Noord, Aruba
 Oranjestad: San Francisco di Asis, J. Irausquinplein 3, Oranjestad, Aruba
 Paradera: Santa Filomena, Paradera 51, Paradera, Aruba
 Pos Chikito: Santa Familia Chapel, Pos Chikito, Savaneta, Aruba
 San Nicolaas: Santa Teresita di Niño Hesus, Theresiaplein 8, Bernhardstraat, San Nicolaas, Aruba; Emanuel Chapel, Rooi Hondu, San Nicolaas, Aruba
 Santa Cruz: Inmaculada Concepcion, Santa Cruz 41, Santa Cruz, Aruba
 Savaneta: Sagrado Curazon di Hesus, Savaneta 338-D, Savaneta, Aruba
 Tanki Leendert: San Papa Juan Pablo II, Rte. 4, Tanki Leendert, Oranjestad, Aruba; Monte Calvario Chapel, Rte. 4, Tanki Leendert, Oranjestad, Aruba

Island of Bonaire
Antriol: La Birgen di Coromoto, Pastorie Antriol, Kaya Korona 126, Bonaire
Bonaire: St. Louis Bertrand Church
Kralendijk: San Bernardo, Pastorie Kralendijk, Plaza Reina Juliana 2, Bonaire
Rincon: San Ludovico Beltran, Pastorie Rincon, Bonaire NA

Island of Curaçao
Barber: San José
Brievengat: La Birgen di Lourdes, Willemstad
Buena Vista: La Birgen Milagrosa
Groot Kwartier: La Birgen del Carmen
Jandoret: Mama di Bon Conseho, Station: Boca San Michiel: San Miguel Archangel; Souax: La Birgen di Guadalupe
Janwe: Sagrado Curazon di Hesus
Koraal Specht: Bon Wardador
Montagne: San Dominico. Station: Fuik: San Francisco
Otrabanda: Santa Ana Minor Basilica, Willemstad
Pietermaai Cathedral:  Reina di Santisimo Rosario (Queen of the Most Holy Rosary) Cathedral, Willemstad
San Mateo: Santa Familia, Willemstad
Sint Willibrordus: San Willibrordo
Santa Maria: Maria Auxiliadora, Willemstad
Santa Rosa: Santa Rosa de Lima
Seru Fortuna: San Martin de Porres
Soto: San Antonio de Padua, Soto
Steenrijk: La Birgen di Altagracia, Willemstad
Suffisant: La Birgen di Fatima
Tera Korà: Spiritu Santo, Kaya Andesit 66, Tera Korà,
Westpunt: San Pedro.  Lagoen: Station: San Juan Apostle,  Pastorie Westpunt,
Wishi: Hesús Misericordioso y Santa Teresita, Schottegatweg West. 33, Wishi
Zuid-Bonam: San Hudas Tadeo, Ronde Klipweg 61, P.O. Box 3909, Zuid-Bona

Island of Saba
The Bottom: Sacred Heart Church
Windwardside: St Paul's Conversion
Zion's Hill: Queen of the Holy Rosary Church

Island of Sint Eustatius
Oranjestad: St Eustatius Catholic Church

Island of Sint Maarten (the southern half of St. Martin)
Philipsburg: St Martin of Tours
Simpson Bay: Mary Star of the Sea
South Reward: The Risen Christ

References
Antilles Episcopal Conference,=Roman Catholic Bishops' Conference of the Antilles

List of Roman Catholic Dioceses in the Caribbean
Roman Catholicism in the Kingdom of the Netherlands in the Caribbean
Roman Catholic Diocese of Willemstad official site in English

External links
Saba Tourism Office church page
Paloma Pictures webpage for Catholic services in Aruba

Roman Catholic dioceses in the Caribbean
Catholic Church in Curaçao
Catholic Church in Aruba
Roman Catholic dioceses in the Kingdom of the Netherlands
Catholic Church in the Dutch Caribbean
Roman Catholic Ecclesiastical Province of Port of Spain